Jordan Alan Cook (born 20 March 1990) is an English professional footballer who plays as a midfielder or a striker.

Career

Sunderland
Cook was born in Hetton-le-Hole, Tyne and Wear and attended Hetton School. He began his career with Hetton Juniors, before joining Sunderland aged seven. Cook progressed through the club's youth system and signed his first professional contract on 30 May 2008. He joined League Two club Darlington on loan on 18 August 2009, before making his debut later that day in a 1–0 defeat at home to Crewe Alexandra, in which he was substituted for Jeff Smith in the 58th minute. His loan spell with Darlington was cut short after sustaining cruciate knee ligament damage. Cook made his Sunderland debut on 26 December 2010 after being introduced as an 82nd-minute substitute for Steed Malbranque in a 2–0 defeat away to Manchester United. He replaced Nedum Onuoha as an 87th-minute substitute to make his home debut in a 4–2 defeat to Chelsea on 1 February 2011.

On 24 March 2011, Cook signed for League One club Walsall on loan until the end of 2010–11. He debuted a day later in a 1–1 draw away to Milton Keynes Dons, having entered the match as a 68th-minute substitute. His first goal for Walsall came in a 3–2 win at home to Brentford on 12 April, and completed the loan spell with eight appearances. After returning to Sunderland, he played in their final match of 2010–11, a 3–0 win away to West Ham United, having entered the match as a 72nd-minute substitute for Asamoah Gyan.

Cook joined Carlisle United on 16 January 2012 on a one-month loan. After making four appearances during his initial loan spell, Cook's loan was extended by a further month until 10 March. He scored his first goal for Carlisle after being introduced as a 74th-minute substitute in a 4–1 win at home to Bury, after which his loan was due to expire. However, the loan was extended on 22 March by a further month, and would expire after the penultimate match of the season against Exeter City under emergency loan rules. Cook scored a brace five days later to help Carlisle come from behind to earn a 2–1 win away to Milton Keynes Dons. He completed the emergency loan with 14 appearances and four goals. After failing to make an appearance for Sunderland in 2011–12, Cook was amongst nine players released by the club in May 2012.

Charlton Athletic
Cook signed a two-year contract with newly promoted Championship club Charlton Athletic on 9 July 2012. He debuted in a 1–1 draw against Leyton Orient in a League Cup first round tie on 14 August, before making his league debut in a 1–1 draw away to Birmingham City four days later, having entered the match as a 77th-minute substitute for Bradley Wright-Phillips. Cook made six further league appearances and one FA Cup appearance for Charlton in 2012–13. He joined League One club Yeovil Town on a one-month loan on 18 March 2013. Cook debuted as a 61st-minute substitute for Gavin Williams in a 2–0 defeat at home to Swindon Town. However, a knee injury meant he returned to Charlton for treatment and made no further appearances for Yeovil. Cook made his first appearance of 2013–14 after being named in the starting lineup against Oxford United in the League Cup first round, which finished as a 4–0 victory. However, his first-team opportunities were limited, and finished the season with only five appearances. On 22 May 2014, it was announced that Cook would be released following the expiration of his contract.

Walsall
On 7 July 2014, Cook returned to League One club Walsall and signed a two-year contract, having previously been on loan with them for two months in 2011. He made his first appearance since his return in a 1–1 draw with Bristol City on 4 October after being introduced as a 34th-minute substitute for the injured Tom Bradshaw. One week later, he scored the opening goal, his first since April 2012 in a 2–1 defeat away to Oldham Athletic. Cook scored a brace to help Walsall come from behind to earn a 3–1 win at home to Barnsley on 13 December. He scored his fourth goal of the season on 7 February 2015 in a 2–0 win away to Doncaster Rovers after only three minutes. Cook came off the bench as a 72nd-minute substitute for Tom Bradshaw to score his fifth goal of the season in stoppage time against Crawley Town in a 5–0 victory on 14 April. Cook also played in every Football League Trophy match, which saw Walsall reach the final of the competition, only to be defeated 2–0 by Bristol City at Wembley Stadium on 22 March. He finished 2014–15 with 39 appearances and five goals.

Cook was named in the starting lineup against Oldham Athletic on the opening day of 2015–16, but was replaced in the 66th minute by Milan Lalkovič in a 1–1 draw. Thereafter, he assumed the role of a substitute, making 36 of his 44 appearances from the bench. However, he scored three times including Walsall's third goal in the 93rd minute of a 3–1 win away to Shrewsbury Town, prior to a brace in a 2–0 win at home to Port Vale after being introduced as a 60th-minute substitute for Kieron Morris. His contributions helped Walsall to qualify for the play-offs after a third-place finish in League One. Cook played in both semi-final legs as a substitute, scoring a late consolation goal in the second leg as Walsall lost 3–1 to Barnsley and 6–1 on aggregate.

Luton Town
On 5 July 2016, Cook signed a two-year contract with League Two club Luton Town after rejecting a new contract with Walsall. He debuted on the opening day of 2016–17 in a 3–0 win away to Plymouth Argyle. Cook scored his first goal for Luton in a 4–1 win at home to Wycombe Wanderers on 3 September. He was released by Luton at the end of the 2017–18 season after the club won promotion to League One.

Grimsby Town
Cook signed for League Two club Grimsby Town on a two-year contract on 22 June 2018. Cook was released at the end of the 2019–20 season. He made 49 appearances in all competitions for The Mariners, scoring eight times.

Gateshead
Cook joined Gateshead of the National League North on 20 October 2020 for the 2020–21 season. Injuries limited Cook to 10 appearances for Gateshead.

Hartlepool United
In September 2021, Cook moved up two divisions when he signed for League Two side Hartlepool United. In October 2021, Cook picked up a groin injury which saw him out for over six weeks. Cook made his return to the starting eleven on 1 January 2022 in 0–0 draw against Oldham Athletic, in which he had a goal ruled out for offside. However, he picked up an injury in the game which saw him ruled out for the rest of the 2021–22 season. At the end of 2021–22 season, Cook was offered a new contract with the club. He joined the club for pre-season training in July but did not sign the contract. On 23 July 2022, Cook tweeted that his surgery had been completed and was aiming to play football again before Christmas time.

Career statistics

Honours
Walsall
Football League Trophy runner-up: 2014–15

Luton Town
EFL League Two runner-up: 2017–18

References

External links

Profile at the Gateshead F.C. website

1990 births
Living people
People from Hetton-le-Hole
Footballers from Tyne and Wear
English footballers
Association football midfielders
Association football forwards
Sunderland A.F.C. players
Darlington F.C. players
Walsall F.C. players
Carlisle United F.C. players
Charlton Athletic F.C. players
Yeovil Town F.C. players
Luton Town F.C. players
Grimsby Town F.C. players
Gateshead F.C. players
Hartlepool United F.C. players
English Football League players
Premier League players
National League (English football) players